Šotra is a Serbian surname.

On June 26/27, 1941, Ustaše drove away 130 Serbs of the families of Šakota, Šotra, Ćorluka and Krulj from the villages of Trijebanj and Kozice.

It may refer to:

Zdravko Šotra (born 1933), Serbian film and television director and screenwriter
Tamara Savić-Šotra (born 1971), Serbian fencer

References

Serbian surnames